The Annie Award for Best Animated Video Game was awarded annually by ASIFA-Hollywood, a non-profit organization that honors contributions to animation, to one animated video game each year from 2005 to 2014. The award is one of the Annie Awards, which are given to contributions to animation, including producers, directors, and voice actors. The Annie Awards were created in 1972 by June Foray to honor individual lifetime contributions to animation. In 1992, the scope of the awards was expanded to honor animation as a whole; the Annie Award for Best Animated Feature was created as a result of this move, and subsequent awards have been created to recognize different contributions to animation. The Annie Award for Best Animated Video Game was created in 2005, and has been awarded yearly since except in 2009. To be eligible for the award, the game must have been released in the year before the next Annie Awards ceremony, and the developers of the game must send a five-minute DVD that shows the gameplay and graphics of the game to a committee appointed by the Board of Directors of ASIFA-Hollywood.

The Annie Award for Best Animated Video Game has been awarded to nine video games. The now-defunct video game development company THQ had six of its games nominated for the Annie Award for Best Animated Video Game, and one of them, Ratatouille, won the award. Among the nominees, seven video games are adaptations of a feature film and three are adaptations of animated television series. Although most nominees have been released for multiple video game consoles, three of the entrants to the 38th Annie Awards (held February 5, 2011) and five contenders at the 39th Annie Awards had only been released on one platform at the time.

Winners and nominees

See also
 British Academy Games Award for Best Game

References
Notes

General

 
 
 
 
 
 
 
 
 

Specific

External links
 Official website of the Annie Awards

Annie Awards
Video game awards